"Fake Plastic Trees" is a song by the English rock band Radiohead, released on their second album, The Bends (1995). It was the third single from The Bends in the UK, and the first in the US. It charted on the UK Singles Chart, the New Zealand Singles Chart, the US Modern Rock Tracks chart, and the Canadian Rock/Alternative chart.

Writing
Thom Yorke, Radiohead's songwriter, said "Fake Plastic Trees" was "the product of a joke that wasn't really a joke, a very lonely, drunken evening and, well, a breakdown of sorts". He said the song arose from a melody he had "no idea what to do with". He did not take his usual approach of keeping note "of whatever my head's singing at the particular moment" or forcing "some nifty phrases" he devised onto the melody, and instead "just recorded whatever was going on in my head". He said: "I wrote those words and laughed. I thought they were really funny, especially that bit about polystyrene."

Recording 
Radiohead recorded "Fake Plastic Trees" at RAK Studios, London, with the producer John Leckie. The sessions were strained, as Radiohead were under pressure from their record label, EMI, to record a single to match the success of their debut, "Creep". The guitarist Ed O'Brien likened one early version of "Fake Plastic Trees" to the Guns N' Roses song "November Rain", saying it was "pompous and bombastic ... just the worst".

Eventually, Leckie had Yorke record a solo take on acoustic guitar, which became the basis of the final version. According to the bassist, Colin Greenwood, Yorke played three takes, then burst into tears. The drummer, Philip Selway, described following Yorke's fluctuating tempo: "Part of the beauty was the way it would actually slip in and out, but trying to follow it was a nightmare." Yorke's performance was influenced by a performance Radiohead attended by the American singer-songwriter Jeff Buckley at the Garage, London. Yorke later said that Buckley gave him the confidence to sing in falsetto.

Reception
Writing for NME in May 1995, John Mulvey felt that "Fake Plastic Trees" lacked substance, and drew comparisons with the stadium rock of U2. It placed at number 385 on Rolling Stone's list of the 500 Greatest Songs of All Time, and at number 28 on Triple J Radio's Hottest 100 of All Time countdown. The acoustic version of "Fake Plastic Trees" was used in the 1995 film Clueless and is credited for introducing Radiohead to a larger American audience.

Track listings
All tracks are written by Radiohead (Thom Yorke, Jonny Greenwood, Ed O'Brien, Colin Greenwood, Philip Selway).

 UK and European single (CD1)
 UK and New Zealand single (cassette)
 Australian single (CD)
 "Fake Plastic Trees" – 4:52
 "India Rubber" – 3:26
 "How Can You Be Sure?" – 4:21

 UK and European single (CD2)
 "Fake Plastic Trees" – 4:52
 "Fake Plastic Trees" (acoustic) – 4:41
 "Bullet Proof..I Wish I Was" (acoustic) – 3:34
 "Street Spirit (Fade Out)" (acoustic) – 4:26

 UK and US promo (CD)
 "Fake Plastic Trees" (edit) – 4:11
 "Fake Plastic Trees" (album version) – 4:50

 US single (CD)
 "Fake Plastic Trees" (album version) – 4:50
 "Planet Telex" (Hexidecimal Mix) – 6:44
 "Killer Cars" – 3:02
 "Fake Plastic Trees" (acoustic version) – 4:45

 US jukebox single (7")
 "Fake Plastic Trees" – 4:50
 "The Bends" – 4:03

 Dutch single (CD)
 "Fake Plastic Trees" – 4:52
 "India Rubber" – 3:26
 "How Can You Be Sure?" – 4:21
 "Fake Plastic Trees" (acoustic) – 4:43

Personnel
 Thom Yorke – vocals, acoustic guitar
 Jonny Greenwood – electric guitar, Hammond organ
 Ed O'Brien – electric guitar
 Colin Greenwood – bass 
 Philip Selway – drums
 Caroline Lavelle – cello
 John Matthias – viola, violin

Charts

Weekly charts

Year-end charts

Certifications

See also
 Artificial trees used for

Notes

Footnotes

Citations

External links
 

Radiohead songs
1995 singles
Parlophone singles
Environmental songs
Rock ballads
Songs written by Thom Yorke
Songs written by Colin Greenwood
Songs written by Jonny Greenwood
Songs written by Philip Selway
Songs written by Ed O'Brien
Song recordings produced by John Leckie
Music videos directed by Jake Scott (director)
1990s ballads